Zizhongosaurus (meaning "Zizhong lizard") is a genus of basal herbivorous sauropod dinosaur which lived in the Early Jurassic (Toarcian) Period of China. It was a large-bodied herbivore characterized by a long neck.

Discovery and naming
The type species Zizhongosaurus chuanchengensis was named in 1983 by Dong Zhiming, Zhou Shiwu and Zhang Yihong. The generic name is derived from Zizhong County in Sichuan Province. The specific name refers to the town of Chuancheng.

The type specimens consist of three syntypes: V9067.1 is a partial dorsal vertebra; V9067.2 is a humerus or upper arm; and V9067.3 is a pubis. All specimens likely were part of a single skeleton, collected from the Ziliujing Formation. Zizhongosaurus was described as a small species.

In 1999 Li Kui mentioned a second species: Zizhongosaurus huangshibanensis but this has remained an undescribed nomen nudum.

Classification
Zizhongosaurus was originally assigned to the Cetiosaurinae but later authors have placed it in either the Vulcanodontidae, as a relative of Barapasaurus, or the Shunosaurinae. It is today often considered a nomen dubium.

References

Early Jurassic dinosaurs of Asia
Vulcanodontidae
Taxa named by Dong Zhiming
Fossil taxa described in 1983
Paleontology in Sichuan
Nomina dubia